Early parliamentary elections were held in Nauru on 12 November 1977, after Parliament had been dissolved by President Bernard Dowiyogo due to a sustained campaign against the government led by former President Hammer DeRoburt, who had been voted out of office the previous year. Particular controversy had been caused by the Supply Act passed in June, and Dowiyogo stated that elections would be held to give him a mandate. After Parliament failed to approve the budget, Dowiyogo asked Speaker David Gadaroa to dissolve the legislature.

Nine seats were won by supporters of Dowiyogo (who ran under the Nauru Party banner), eight by those of DeRoburt, and one by a candidate without any affiliation, but who supported the Nauru Party. Following the election, Dowiyogo was re-elected President by Parliament on 15 November.

Campaign
A total of 52 candidates contested the 18 seats.

Results

Aftermath
Following the elections, the newly elected Parliament met on 15 November. Gadaroa was re-elected as Speaker and Leo Keke as Deputy Speaker, both running unopposed.

Dowiyogo and DeRoburt were the two nominees for president, with Dowiyogo winning by nine votes to eight. He subsequently formed a cabinet consisting of Kenas Aroi as Minister of Island Development, Industry and Civil Aviation, Kinza Clodumar as Minister of Finance, Lagumot Harris as Minister of Education and Health and Ruben Kun as Minister of Works. After the new government was formed, DeRoburt refused to follow parliamentary procedure or instructions from the Speaker.

Following a heated budget debate at the start of January, during which Dowiyogo resigned and was re-elected, Clodumar was sacked as Minister of Finance and replaced by Kun. Leo Keke was appointed Minister of Works. However, Dowiyogo resigned again in April 1978 after a bill was defeated in parliament. Lagumot Harris was elected president, but resigned less than a month later when another bill was rejected. Following Harris' resignation, DeRoburt was elected.

His cabinet included Buraro Detudamo as Minister of Justice, James Ategan Bop as Minister of Finance, Joseph Detsimea Audoa as Minister for Education and Health and Totouwa Depaune as Minister for Works and Community Services. A cabinet reshuffle in December 1978 saw Harris replace Depaune as Minister for Works and Community Services, Kenas Aroi take over as Minister for Justice, Detudamo become Minister for Finance.

References

Nauru
1977 in Nauru
Elections in Nauru
Election and referendum articles with incomplete results